Tyler Shaan Adams (born February 14, 1999) is an American professional soccer player who plays for Premier League club Leeds United and captains the United States national team. Primarily a midfielder, Adams is capable of playing as a fullback or winger on either side of the defense or midfield.

A homegrown player of the New York Red Bulls academy, Adams turned professional with the New York Red Bulls II as a sixteen-year-old before joining the New York Red Bulls first team a season later. Adams joined RB Leipzig in January 2019. Adams joined Leeds United three and a half years later in July 2022.

Adams represented the United States at multiple youth levels before making his senior team debut in 2017. He won the U.S. Soccer Player of the Year award in 2022.

Club career

Youth
Adams joined the Red Bulls Academy in 2012 and played with the under-13, under-14, and under-16 sides before turning professional.

New York Red Bulls II
On March 19, 2015, Adams was signed to New York Red Bulls II, the club's senior reserve team playing in the United Soccer League. Adams made his debut for the team on April 4, 2015, in a 4–1 victory over Toronto FC II, the first victory in club history. After appearing regularly for NYRB II during the 2016 season, Adams helped the club to a 5–1 victory over Swope Park Rangers in the 2016 USL Cup Final.

New York Red Bulls

On July 23, 2015, Adams made his debut with the New York Red Bulls first team featuring in a friendly match against Premier League champions Chelsea. He scored the second goal of the match, slotting a header past Asmir Begović in the 69th minute as the Red Bulls went on to win 4–2.

Adams signed his first senior team contract on November 3, 2015, and joined the first team in preseason training camp in 2016. Adams made his first MLS bench appearance as an unused substitute on April 1, 2016, during a 1–0 loss to the New England Revolution and on April 13 made his MLS debut, starting against the San Jose Earthquakes before returning to Red Bulls II on loan for the remainder of the season.

Adams emerged as a regular starter for the Red Bulls senior team in the 2017 season. On August 15, 2017, Adams helped New York to a 3–2 come from behind victory over FC Cincinnati, assisting on Bradley Wright-Phillips's 77th-minute equalizer. With the win New York reached their first Open Cup final since 2003. Adams scored his first two MLS goals in a 3–3 draw with D.C. United on September 27, 2017.

On March 13, 2018, Adams opened the scoring for New York in a 3–1 victory over Club Tijuana, helping the club advance to the semifinals of the CONCACAF Champions League for the first time.

RB Leipzig

2019 season
Adams joined RB Leipzig in January 2019, reuniting him with former coach Jesse Marsch. He made his first league start on January 27 in a 4–0 victory against Fortuna Düsseldorf. On February 16, Adams recorded his first Bundesliga assist in a 3–1 victory over Stuttgart. He missed the entirety of April games due to an abductor injury, and until then Leipzig had not lost a single game with him on the field. On May 16, Adams returned to the team, and eleven days later started the DFB-Pokal final against Bayern Munich to which Leipzig lost 0–3.

2019–20 season
A groin injury kept Adams sidelined for the summer of 2019 and the first half of the 2019–20 Bundesliga season. He returned for the last game before winter break, playing 86 minutes in a 3–1 victory over FC Augsburg. On March 10, Adams made his UEFA Champions League debut in the second leg game against Tottenham Hotspur, when he entered in the 56th minute as a substitute for Nordi Mukiele who sustained a head injury. Adams missed the first leg due to a minor calf injury. The game finished 3–0 (4–0 on aggregate) with Leipzig victorious and advancing to the next round.

On August 13, 2020, Adams scored the winning goal for Leipzig in a 2–1 win over Atlético Madrid, helping the club advance to the semifinals of the UEFA Champions League for the first time.

Leeds United
Adams joined Leeds United on a five-year contract for a reported £20 million transfer fee on July 6, 2022. He made his league debut for Leeds on August 6 as part of the starting line-up in their season opener, a 2–1 home win over Wolverhampton Wanderers.

International career
Adams has represented the United States at the under-15, under-17, and under-20 levels. He appeared in all of his team's matches at the 2015 CONCACAF Under-17 Championships in Honduras, helping the United States qualify for the 2015 FIFA Under-17 World Cup.
 In May 2017 Adams played every match for the United States at the 2017 FIFA Under-20 World Cup in South Korea. On November 14, 2017, Adams earned his first cap for the senior national team, playing the full 90 minutes in a 1–1 draw with Portugal. On September 11, 2018, Tyler Adams scored a goal against Mexico in a friendly at Nissan Stadium in Nashville, Tennessee.

In June 2019, Adams was named to the squad for the 2019 CONCACAF Gold Cup, but was forced to withdraw due to an injury.

In November 2022, Adams was named captain of the United States squad for the 2022 FIFA World Cup. This made him the youngest captain at the competition and the youngest American captain since 1950. On January 13, 2023, it was announced he had been voted the 2022 U.S. Soccer Male Player of the Year after he led the Americans to the knockout stages of the World Cup.

Personal life
Adams was born in Dutchess County, New York, to Melissa Russo. He is of African American descent through his father. His stepfather, Daryl Sullivan, coached soccer at the high school and college levels. Adams graduated from Roy C. Ketcham High School in Wappingers Falls, New York.

Career statistics

Club

International

Honors
New York Red Bulls II
USL Cup: 2016

New York Red Bulls
MLS Supporters Shield: 2018

RB Leipzig
DFB-Pokal: 2021–22

United States U20
CONCACAF U-20 Championship: 2017

United States
CONCACAF Nations League: 2019–20
Individual
U.S. Soccer Player of the Year: 2022

References

External links

1999 births
Living people
African-American soccer players
American expatriate soccer players
American expatriate soccer players in Germany
American soccer players
Association football midfielders
Bundesliga players
Expatriate sportspeople in England
Homegrown Players (MLS)
Major League Soccer players
New York Red Bulls players
New York Red Bulls II players
Premier League players
RB Leipzig players
Leeds United F.C. players
2022 FIFA World Cup players
Soccer players from New York (state)
Sportspeople from the New York metropolitan area
United States men's international soccer players
United States men's under-20 international soccer players
United States men's youth international soccer players
USL Championship players
Roy C. Ketcham High School alumni